Events in the year 1973 in Belgium.

Incumbents
Monarch: Baudouin
Prime Minister: Gaston Eyskens (to 26 January); Edmond Leburton (from 26 January)

Events

Births
 20 January – Queen Mathilde of Belgium

Deaths
 25 October – Émile Masson (born 1888), cyclist

References

 
1970s in Belgium
Belgium
Years of the 20th century in Belgium
Belgium